Dhanana is a village in the eponymous tehsil of the Bhiwani district in the Indian state of Haryana. This village is directly connected by roads with 9 villages. The neighbouring villages are Talu, Jatai, Sukhpura, Bhaini Bharro, Badesara, Mitathal, Ghuskani, Tigdana, Mandhana, Pur, Siwara. 3 neighbour small villages are also part of Dhanana name Jatai, Sukhpura, Kuchpad. The fields are very far away from the village because of which a farmer gets difficulties in reaching their field for work so they started living in their own fields that led to the formation of Jatai, Sukhpura, and Kuchpad villages. Favourite game of village is  Handball which makes it special at national level.

Geography and Schools 
There is a very large Anaj mandi (a wholesale market of food grains in south asia) where grains are collected and then transported for stock to Bhiwani. In this village there are five water reservoir tank: one in Dhanana 1; and, two in Dhanana 3. In half harvested area crop rice is being grown, and in other half crop millet and cotton are grown. There are 3 primary, 1 only girls & 1 higher government school and 6-7 Private school. There a government Hospital is also situated under which 14 villages comes. In this hospital, Dental, X ray, Child delivery and much more facilities are available, and a vetnery hospital is also available. There is a maximum number of Jat caste of Ghanghas Surname. , the village had 2,349 households with a population of 11,766 of which 6,325 were male and 5,441 female.

Area division 
Dhanana is divided in three regions (panna) named:
 Dhanana 1- tihad panna
 Dhanana 2 - milvan panna
 Dhanana 3 - kalhaan panna

Religious values 
Dhanana have many demigods but few of them are:-

1. Mata fulamde- 
                       
Worshipsed on Wednesday generally. Four fairs are also arranged at mata fulumde mandir continuously on Wednesdays only after holi but nowadays on every Wednesday fairs are arranged .

2. Baba bhramchari mandir:-
                        
Situated in Dhanana-3 part and worshiped on 12th of month according to Hindu calendar.

3. Goga mandir:-

There are separate temple for separate Pana but among all Dhanana 1st temple is large and beautiful.

4. Baba Kuchpadiya Mandir:-
                           
People of not only Dhanana but also of Jatai,Sukhpura,Bhaini Bharro also believe this and is worshiped on Dashmi tithi according to Hindu Calendar. There in this Temple people worship by having milk on it. Children's comes there to have Bhandara parsad and have milk up to full stomach. Some of main Mehant name are Baba Dayadas, Syanti Das, Gyan Das,Sankar Das,Charmati Das,Gyan Das.
Few others main temple Bhaiya Baba,Bhudhi Mata,Chauganan Mata,Khada Baba,Dadu dyal mandir ,khatu syam mandir etc.
People not from side by villages but from far about cities and countries like Nepal also visit to dhanana for its religious value.

References

Villages in Bhiwani district